The men's 4 × 100 metres relay was the shorter of the two men's relays on the Athletics at the 1964 Summer Olympics program in Tokyo. It was held on 20 October and 21 October 1964.  21 teams, for a total of 85 athletes, from 21 nations competed, with 1 team of 4 not starting in the first round. The first round and the semifinals were held on 20 October with the final on 21 October.

The traditionally strong American team was weakened by the injuries to Mel Pender and Trent Jackson. The defending champions United Team of Germany (with no returning members) failed to get out of the semi-finals.

The final began with Andrzej Zieliński out fast, making up the stagger on American substitute Paul Drayton on his outside. The Poles exchanged smoothly and their 4th place runner from the finals Wieslaw Maniak held a foot advantage on (plus the stagger) on Gerry Ashworth. Inside of them, France and Jamaica were making strong showings.  Claude Piquemal put France into the lead through the turn with Jamaica, USSR and Poland all ahead when substitute Richard Stebbins handed off to Bob Hayes 3 meters behind France's Jocelyn Delecour. Hayes making up the gap halfway down the straightaway then pulled away to a clear American victory and new world record. 3 meters behind Hayes, Poland's Marian Dudziak was able to out lean Delecour for silver. The United States' Bob Hayes ran the final 100m of the relay in 8.6 seconds according to some estimate. This remains the fastest anchor leg of all time.

Delecour famously said to Drayton before the relay final that, "You can't win, all you have is Bob Hayes."  Drayton was able to reply afterwards, "That's all we need."

Results

First round

The top four teams in each of the 3 heats as well as the four fastest remaining team advanced.

First round, heat 1

First round, heat 2

First round, heat 3

Semifinals

The top four teams in each of the two semifinals advanced to the final.

Semifinal 1

Okorafor took Amu's place for Nigeria.

The American team tied the old Olympic record at 39.5 seconds.

Semifinal 2

Final

Venezuela and Italy tied the old Olympic record.  The United States, Poland, France, Jamaica, and the Soviet Union all broke it, with the U.S. also breaking the world record. The United States' Bob Hayes ran the final 100m of the relay in 8.6 seconds, passing three teams and bringing the U.S. from 4th to 1st place. This remains the fastest anchor leg of all time.

References

 Official Report

Athletics at the 1964 Summer Olympics
Relay foot races at the Olympics
4 × 100 metres relay
Men's events at the 1964 Summer Olympics